Moira Lake is a small freshwater lake located on a plateau it shares with Marlene Lake, a short distance north of Big Snow Mountain, in King County, Washington. The lake can be accessed from the trail that leads past Myrtle Lake, which is West of Marlene Lake. The outflow of Moira Lake joins the creeks from Marlene Lake, Fools Gold Lake and other snow melting creeks to empty as the inflow of Lake Dorothy, which outflows as the East Fork of the Miller River. The lake is home to cutthroat trout and rainbow trout.

See also 
 List of lakes of the Alpine Lakes Wilderness

References 

Lakes of King County, Washington
Lakes of the Alpine Lakes Wilderness
Okanogan National Forest